The Willamette Falls Paper Company is an American paper mill located just above the Willamette Falls on the northwest bank of the Willamette River, in the city of West Linn, Oregon.

The falls have been home to several paper mills beginning with the Oregon City Paper Manufacturing Co. in 1866. The Willamette Pulp and Paper Co. opened on the West Linn side during 1889, employing up to 1,600 people and credited by historians with fueling regional publishing, and supplying paper for publications across the country. The ownership of the mills has changed several times; it was owned by Crown Zellerbach until 1997. The Blue Heron Paper Company shut down in 2011, and the West Linn Paper Company announced it was shutting down in October 2017, but reopened in November 2019 as Willamette Falls Paper Company with 97 of its previous employees, after a "multimillion dollar bet" from investor Ken Peterson's Columbia Ventures, who intends to demonstrate the viability of making paper using wheat farmers' waste straw instead of wood pulp.

References 

Companies based in Oregon
West Linn, Oregon